The Chengzhui line is a line of the Taiwan Railways Administration connecting the Taichung line at Chenggong station to the West Coast line at Zhuifen station, forming a wye. Currently, only local services run through the Chengzhui Line, make a direct connect beteeen stations on Mountain line and stations on Coastal line and 11.8 km shorter of travel route and without needed to transfer at Changhua station, saving about 10 minutes travel time and waiting time while transfer at Changhua station.

As part of the "Greater Taichung Yamanote Line" plan by the Ministry of Transportation and Communications, the line was upgraded to double-track to allow for increased traffic between downtown Taichung and its coastal suburbs. Construction lasted between March 2019 and January 2020.

Stations

References

TRA routes
Railway lines opened in 1922
3 ft 6 in gauge railways in Taiwan
1922 establishments in Taiwan